Uwe Klimaschefski (born 11 December 1938) is a German former football player and manager who played as a forward.

References

1938 births
Living people
German footballers
FSV Frankfurt players
Association football forwards
Bundesliga players
German football managers
FC 08 Homburg managers
Hapoel Haifa F.C. managers
1. FSV Mainz 05 managers
Hertha BSC managers
1. FC Saarbrücken managers
FC St. Gallen managers
TSV 1860 Munich managers
German expatriate football managers
Expatriate football managers in Israel
German expatriate sportspeople in Israel
Expatriate football managers in Switzerland
German expatriate sportspeople in Switzerland
People from Bremerhaven